Gamini Vijith Vijithamuni Soysa is a Sri Lankan politician. He was the Chief Minister  of Uva Province  in Sri Lanka from July 2004 to Aug 2009. He was elected to the Sri Lankan Parliament in 1989, 2000, 2001 and 2010 from Monaragala.

References

Sri Lankan Buddhists
Chief Ministers of Uva Province
Members of the Uva Provincial Council
Members of the 9th Parliament of Sri Lanka
Members of the 11th Parliament of Sri Lanka
Members of the 12th Parliament of Sri Lanka
Members of the 14th Parliament of Sri Lanka
Members of the 15th Parliament of Sri Lanka
Living people
Year of birth missing (living people)
Sinhalese politicians